Wisbech was a rural district in Cambridgeshire in England from 1894 to 1974.

It was formed from that part of the Wisbech rural sanitary district which was in Isle of Ely, Cambridgeshire, by the Local Government Act 1894.  It covered the parishes of Elm, Leverington, Outwell, Parson Drove, Tydd St Giles, Upwell and Wisbech St Mary.

The offices were in Alexandra Road, Wisbech.

When first created, the district consisted of two detached parts separated by the long, narrow tail of Wisbech Municipal Borough. In 1933 the south-western part of Wisbech MB was transferred to the parish of Elm, leaving Wisbech RD surrounding the town on three sides.

It formed part of the administrative county of Isle of Ely from its creation until 1965, when this merged to form part of Cambridgeshire and Isle of Ely.

In 1974 the district was abolished under the Local Government Act 1972.  It became part of the Fenland district.

Coat of Arms 

ARMS: Barry wavy of eight Argent and Vert a Cornucopia erect Or the fruit proper all within a Bordure Gules charged with eight Ducal Coronets Gold.

CREST: Out of a Circlet Argent charged with three Mullets Sable a demi Lion also Argent gorged with a Ducal Coronet Or and supporting a Staff of the first flying therefrom a Banner Azure charged with a Lily Flower also Argent; Mantled Vert doubled Argent.

Motto 'THESAUROS IN AGRO' - For we have treasures in the field.

Granted 11 October 1954.

References

History of Cambridgeshire
Districts of England created by the Local Government Act 1894
Districts of England abolished by the Local Government Act 1972
Rural districts of England
Fenland District